New Empire can refer to:

 New Kingdom of Egypt, when Ancient Egypt was at the height of its power
 New Empire (band), an Australian band
 New Empire Cinema (disambiguation), several cinemas
 New Empire Theatre
 A New Empire, a 2016 EP by Ailee
 Final Fantasy XV: A New Empire, a mobile game

See also
 New (disambiguation)
 Empire (disambiguation)
 New Kingdom (disambiguation)